Perbakti is an eroded stratovolcano west of Mount Salak in West Java, Indonesia. The summit is elongated in a northwest-southwest direction, in which Gunung Endut volcano rises above the saddle of Perbakti. Two 2 km wide depressions on the northern and the southern side has formed two rivers, the Kaluwung Herang and Pamatutan rivers. Fumaroles, mud pots and hot springs are located on the south and the southeast flanks.

See also 

 List of volcanoes in Indonesia

References 

Stratovolcanoes of Indonesia
Mountains of West Java
Volcanoes of West Java